Clarence "Preacher" Davis was a professional baseball third baseman who played in the Negro leagues in the 1920s.

Davis made his professional debut in 1921 with the Columbus Buckeyes, and played the following season with the Bacharach Giants.

References

External links
 and Baseball-Reference Black Baseball stats and Seamheads

Place of birth missing
Place of death missing
Year of birth missing
Year of death missing
Bacharach Giants players
Columbus Buckeyes (Negro leagues) players
Baseball third basemen